{{safesubst:#invoke:RfD||2=Question types|month = March
|day =  8
|year = 2023
|time = 00:57
|timestamp = 20230308005708

|content=
REDIRECT Exam

}}